ECL may refer to:

Science and technology
 Electrochemiluminescence
 Enhanced chemiluminescence
 Emitter-coupled logic
 Enterochromaffin-like cell

Computing
 ECL programming language, an extensible programming language
 ECL (data-centric programming language)
 Embeddable Common Lisp

Sport
 East Cornwall League, an English football league
 Eastern Colored League, a defunct American baseball league
 Eastern Counties Football League, in England
 European Cricket League, a professional cricket league organized by ICC member federations
 UEFA Europa Conference League, annual football club competition organised by UEFA

Other uses
 Eccleston Park railway station, in England
 Ecolab, a sanitation supply company
 École centrale de Lyon, a graduate engineering school in Lyon, France
 Educational Community License, a software license
 Exit Control List, system of border control maintained by the Government of Pakistan
 Extended collective licensing, collective copyright and related rights laws and licensing agreement